Calocephalus lacteus, commonly known as lemon beauty-heads, is a species of flowering plant in the family Asteraceae. It has yellow cylindrical shaped flowers and grey stems and grows in the eastern states of Australia

References

Gnaphalieae
Asterales of Australia
Flora of New South Wales
Flora of Victoria (Australia)
Flora of South Australia
Flora of Tasmania
Flora of Queensland
Flora of the Australian Capital Territory